Lung transplantation, or pulmonary transplantation, is a surgical procedure in which one or both lungs are replaced by lungs from a donor. Donor lungs can be retrieved from a living or deceased donor. A living donor can only donate one lung lobe. With some lung diseases, a recipient may only need to receive a single lung. With other lung diseases such as cystic fibrosis, it is imperative that a recipient receive two lungs. While lung transplants carry certain associated risks, they can also extend life expectancy and enhance the quality of life for those with end stage pulmonary disease.

Qualifying conditions 
Lung transplantation is the therapeutic measure of last resort for patients with end-stage lung disease who have exhausted all other available treatments without improvement. A variety of conditions may make such surgery necessary. As of 2005, the most common reasons for lung transplantation in the United States were:
 27% chronic obstructive pulmonary disease (COPD), including emphysema;
 16% idiopathic pulmonary fibrosis;
 14% cystic fibrosis;
 12% idiopathic (formerly known as "primary") pulmonary hypertension;
 5% alpha 1-antitrypsin deficiency;
 2% replacing previously transplanted lungs that have since failed;
 24% other causes, including bronchiectasis and sarcoidosis.

Contraindications 
Despite the severity of a patient's respiratory condition, certain pre-existing conditions may make a person a poor candidate for lung transplantation:
 Concurrent chronic illness (e.g., congestive heart failure, kidney disease, liver disease)
 Current infections, including HIV and hepatitis
 However, more and more often, hepatitis C patients are both being transplanted and are also being used as donors if the recipient is hepatitis C positive. Similarly, select HIV-infected individuals have received lung transplants after being evaluated on a case-by-case basis.
 Current or recent cancer
 Current use of alcohol, tobacco or illegal drugs
 Age
 Psychiatric conditions
 History of noncompliance with medical instructions

History 
The history of organ transplants began with several attempts that were unsuccessful due to transplant rejection. Animal experimentation by various pioneers, including Vladimir Demikhov and Henry Metras, during the 1940s and 1950s, first demonstrated that the procedure was technically feasible. James Hardy of the University of Mississippi performed the first human lung transplant on June 11, 1963. Following a single-lung transplantation, the patient, identified later as convicted murderer John Richard Russell, survived for 18 days. From 1963 to 1978, multiple attempts at lung transplantation failed because of rejection and problems with anastomotic bronchial healing. It was only after the invention of the heart-lung machine, coupled with the development of immunosuppressive drugs such as ciclosporin, that organs such as the lungs could be transplanted with a reasonable chance of patient recovery.

The first successful transplant surgery involving the lungs was a heart-lung transplant, performed by Dr. Bruce Reitz of Stanford University in 1981 on a woman who had idiopathic pulmonary hypertension.
 1983: First successful long-term single lung transplant (Tom Hall) by Joel Cooper (Toronto)
 1986: First successful long-term double lung transplant (Ann Harrison) by Joel D. Cooper (Toronto)
 1988: First successful long-term double lung transplant for cystic fibrosis by Joel Cooper (Toronto).

In 1988, Vera Dwyer, a woman from County Sligo in Ireland, was diagnosed with an irreversible, chronic and fibrotic lung disease. Later on that year, she received a single lung transplant in the UK. In November 2018, Ms. Dwyer was recognized as the world's longest surviving single lung transplant recipient in an event at the Mater Hospital in Dublin.

Transplant requirements

Requirements for potential donors 
There are certain requirements for potential lung donors, due to the needs of the potential recipient. In the case of living donors, this is also in consideration of how the surgery will affect the donor:
 Healthy
 Size match
 The donated lung or lungs must be large enough to adequately oxygenate the patient, but small enough to fit within the recipient's chest cavity
 Age
 Blood type

Requirements for potential recipients 
While a transplant center is free to set its own criteria for transplant candidates, certain requirements are generally agreed upon:
 End-stage lung disease
 Has exhausted other available therapies without success
 No other chronic medical conditions (e.g., heart, kidney, liver)
 Some patients with these diseases, if their condition can be made to improve to the point where they are stable enough to survive the operation, are granted an exception- many individuals with end-stage lung disease will have acute or chronic illnesses in other organs);
 No current infections or recent cancer. Some patients, on a case by case basis, with lung cancer or other cancers, may be allowed. There are also certain cases where pre-existing infection is unavoidable, as with many patients with cystic fibrosis. In such cases, transplant centers, at their own discretion, may accept or reject patients with current infections of B. cepacia or MRSA
 No HIV or hepatitis, although some recipients with the same type of hepatitis as the donor can receive a lung, and individuals with HIV who can be stabilized and can have a low HIV viral load may be eligible;
 No alcohol, smoking, or drug abuse (some individuals who can cease these habits and comply with treatment may be given the chance)
 Within an acceptable weight range (marked undernourishment or obesity are both associated with increased mortality)
 Age (single vs. double tx)
 Acceptable psychological profile
 Has a social support system
 Financially able to pay for expenses (where medical care is paid for directly by the patient)
 Able to comply with post-transplant regimen. A lung transplant is a major operation, and following the transplant, the patient must be willing to adhere to a lifetime regimen of medications as well as continuing medical care.

Medical tests for potential transplant candidates 
Patients who are being considered for placement on the organ transplant list undergo extensive medical tests to evaluate their overall health status and suitability for transplant surgery.
 Blood typing; the recipient's blood type must match the donor's, due to antigens that are present on donated lungs. A mismatch of blood type can lead to a strong response by the immune system and subsequent rejection of the transplanted organs
 Tissue typing; ideally, the lung tissue would also match as closely as possible between the donor and the recipient, but the desire to find a highly compatible donor organ must be balanced against the patient's immediacy of need
 Chest X-ray – PA & LAT, to verify the size of the lungs and the chest cavity
 Pulmonary function tests
 CT Scan (High Resolution Thoracic & Abdominal)
 Bone mineral density scan
 MUGA (Gated cardiac blood pool scan)
 Cardiac stress test (Dobutamine/Thallium scan)
 Ventilation/perfusion (V/Q) scan
 Electrocardiogram
 Cardiac catheterization
 Echocardiogram

Lung allocation score 

Before 2005, donor lungs within the United States were allocated by the United Network for Organ Sharing on a first-come, first-served basis to patients on the transplant list. This was replaced by the current system, in which prospective lung recipients of age of 12 and older are assigned a lung allocation score or LAS, which takes into account various measures of the patient's health. The new system allocates donated lungs according to the immediacy of need rather than how long a patient has been on the transplant list. Patients who are under the age of 12 are still given priority based on how long they have been on the transplant waitlist. The length of time spent on the list is also the deciding factor when multiple patients have the same lung allocation score.

Patients who are accepted as good potential transplant candidates must carry a pager with them at all times in case a donor organ becomes available. These patients must also be prepared to move to their chosen transplant center at a moment's notice. Such patients may be encouraged to limit their travel within a certain geographical region in order to facilitate rapid transport to a transplant center.

Types of lung transplant

Lobe 
A lobe transplant is a surgery in which part of a living or deceased donor's lung is removed and used to replace the recipient's diseased lung. In living donation, this procedure requires the donation of lobes from two different people, replacing a lung on each side of the recipient. Donors who have been properly screened should be able to maintain a normal quality of life despite the reduction in lung volume. In deceased lobar transplantation, one donor can provide both lobes.

Single-lung 
Many patients can be helped by the transplantation of a single healthy lung. The donated lung typically comes from a donor who has been pronounced brain-dead.

Double-lung 
Certain patients may require both lungs to be replaced. This is especially the case for people with cystic fibrosis, due to the bacterial colonization commonly found within such patients' lungs; if only one lung were transplanted, bacteria in the native lung could potentially infect the newly transplanted organ.

Heart–lung 

Some respiratory patients may also have severe cardiac disease which would necessitate a heart transplant. These patients can be treated by a surgery in which both lungs and the heart are replaced by organs from a donor or donors.

A particularly involved example of this has been termed a "domino transplant" in the media. First performed in 1987, this type of transplant typically involves the transplantation of a heart and lungs into recipient A, whose own healthy heart is removed and transplanted into recipient B.

Procedure 
While the surgical details will depend on the type of transplant, many steps are common to all these procedures. Before operating on the recipient, the transplant surgeon inspects the donor lung(s) for signs of damage or disease. If the lung or lungs are approved, then the recipient is connected to an IV line and various monitoring equipment, including pulse oximetry. The patient will be given general anesthesia, and a machine will breathe for him or her.

It takes about one hour for the pre-operative preparation of the patient. A single lung transplant takes about four to eight hours, while a double lung transplant takes about six to twelve hours to complete. A history of prior chest surgery may complicate the procedure and require additional time.

Single-lung 

In single-lung transplants, the lung with the worse pulmonary function is chosen for replacement. If both lungs function equally, then the right lung is usually favored for removal because it avoids having to maneuver around the heart, as would be required for excision of the left lung.

In a single-lung transplant the process starts out after the donor lung has been inspected and the decision to accept the donor lung for the patient has been made. An incision is generally made from under the shoulder blade around the chest, ending near the sternum. An alternate method involves an incision under the breastbone. In the case of a singular lung transplant the lung is collapsed, the blood vessels in the lung tied off, and the lung removed at the bronchial tube. The donor lung is placed, the blood vessels and bronchial tube reattached, and the lung reinflated. To make sure the lung is satisfactory and to clear any remaining blood and mucus in the new lung a bronchoscopy will be performed. When the surgeons are satisfied with the performance of the lung the chest incision will be closed.

Double-lung 
A double-lung transplant, also known as a bilateral transplant, can be done either sequentially, en bloc, or simultaneously. Sequential is more common than en bloc. This is equivalent to having two separate single-lung transplants done.

The transplantation process starts after the donor lungs are inspected and the decision to transplant has been made. An incision is then made from under the patient's armpit, around to the sternum, and then back towards the other armpit; this is known as a clamshell incision. In the case of a sequential transplant the recipient's lung with the poorest lung functions is collapsed, the blood vessels tied off, and cut at the corresponding bronchi. The new lung is then placed and the blood vessels reattached. To make sure the lung is satisfactory before transplanting the other a bronchoscopy is performed. When the surgeons are satisfied with the performance of the new lung, surgery on the second lung will proceed. In 10% to 20% of double-lung transplants the patient is hooked up to a heart-lung machine which pumps blood for the body and supplies fresh oxygen.

Post-operative care 
Immediately following the surgery, the patient is placed in an intensive care unit for monitoring, normally for a period of a few days. The patient is put on a ventilator to assist breathing. Nutritional needs are generally met via total parenteral nutrition, although in some cases a nasogastric tube is sufficient for feeding. Chest tubes are put in so that excess fluids may be removed. Because the patient is confined to bed, a urinary catheter is used. IV lines are used in the neck and arm for monitoring and giving medications.
After a few days, barring any complications, the patient may be transferred to a general inpatient ward for further recovery. The average hospital stay following a lung transplant is generally one to three weeks, though complications may require a longer period of time. After this stage, patients are typically required to attend rehabilitation gym for approximately 3 months to regain fitness. Light weights, exercise bike, treadmill, stretches and more are all a part of the rehabilitation programme.

There may be a number of side effects following the surgery. Because certain nerve connections to the lungs are cut during the procedure, transplant recipients cannot feel the urge to cough or feel when their new lungs are becoming congested. They must therefore make conscious efforts to take deep breaths and cough in order to clear secretions from the lungs. Their heart rate responds less quickly to exertion due to the cutting of the vagus nerve that would normally help regulate it. They may also notice a change in their voice due to potential damage to the nerves that coordinate the vocal cords.

Evidence suggests that exercise may contribute to speeding up physical recovery in adults after lung transplantation, helping to minimize disability from physical inactivity, both pre and post-transplant. However, there aren’t any detailed guidelines on how exercise should be performed in this type of population.

The results obtained from a 2021 Systematic Review concluded that the effects of exercise in this population are still very questionable. While some studies do report benefits taken from exercising, while others have not reached the same conclusions. Nonetheless, the articles involved in this systematic review reported enhancements in muscle strength and increased bone mineral density as well as improvements in 6MWT.

Miscellaneous 
Post-transplant patients are held from driving for the first 3 months pending an assessment of the patient's capacity to drive; this assessment is usually performed by an occupational therapist. Eyesight, physical ability to do simple actions such as check blind spots, wear a seat belt safely without the wound site being affected and hand eye coordination are all assessed.

Hygiene becomes more important in everyday living due to the immunosuppressant drugs which are required every day to prevent transplant rejection. Lack of a strong immune system leaves transplant recipients vulnerable to infections. Care must be taken in food preparation and hygiene as gastroenteritis becomes more of a risk.

Risks 

As with any surgical procedure, there are risks of bleeding and infection. The newly transplanted lung itself may fail to properly heal and function. Because a large portion of the patient's body has been exposed to the outside air, sepsis is a possibility, so antibiotics will be given to try to prevent that. Other complications include Post-transplant lymphoproliferative disorder, a form of lymphoma due to the immune suppressants, and gastrointestinal inflammation and ulceration of the stomach and esophagus.

Transplant rejection is a primary concern, both immediately after the surgery and continuing throughout the patient's life. Because the transplanted lung or lungs come from another person, the recipient's immune system will see it as an invader and attempt to neutralize it. Transplant rejection is a serious condition and must be treated as soon as possible.

Signs of rejection:
 fever;
 flu-like symptoms, including chills, dizziness, nausea, general feeling of illness, night sweats;
 increased difficulty in breathing;
 worsening pulmonary test results;
 increased chest pain or tenderness;
 increase or decrease in body weight of more than two kilograms in a 24-hour period.

In order to prevent transplant rejection and subsequent damage to the new lung or lungs, patients must take a regimen of immunosuppressive drugs. Patients will normally have to take a combination of these medicines in order to combat the risk of rejection. This is a lifelong commitment, and must be strictly adhered to. The immunosuppressive regimen is begun just before or after surgery. Usually the regimen includes ciclosporin, azathioprine and corticosteroids, but as episodes of rejection may reoccur throughout a patient's life, the exact choices and dosages of immunosuppressants may have to be modified over time. Sometimes tacrolimus is given instead of ciclosporin and mycophenolate mofetil instead of azathioprine.

The immunosuppressants that are needed to prevent organ rejection also introduce some risks. By lowering the body's ability to mount an immune reaction, these medicines also increase the chances of infection. Antibiotics may be prescribed in order to treat or prevent such infections. In turn, infection may increase the risk of rejection, and generally an interaction may prevail between both risks. Certain medications may also have nephrotoxic or other potentially harmful side-effects. Other medications may also be prescribed in order to help alleviate these side effects. There is also the risk that a patient may have an allergic reaction to the medications. Close follow-up care is required in order to balance the benefits of these drugs versus their potential risks.

Chronic rejection, meaning repeated bouts of rejection symptoms beyond the first year after the transplant surgery, occurs in approximately 50% of patients. Such chronic rejection presents itself as bronchiolitis obliterans, or less frequently, atherosclerosis.

Prognosis 
These statistics are based on data from 2008. The source data made no distinction between living and deceased donor organs, nor was any distinction made between lobar, single, and double lung transplants.

Transplanted lungs typically last three to five years before showing signs of failure.

A 2019 cohort study of nearly 10,000 lung transplant recipients in the US demonstrated significantly improved long-term survival using sirolimus + tacrolimus (median survival 8.9 years) instead of mycophenolate mofetil + tacrolimus (median survival 7.1 years) for immunosuppressive therapy starting at one year after transplant. Since sirolimus is not administered until at least 3-12 months after transplant, these median survival estimates were conditional on surviving 1 year post-transplant.

See also 
 Sarah Murnaghan lung transplant controversy
 Post-transplant survival measure

References

Further reading

External links 

 
 United Network for Organ Sharing
 International Society for Heart and Lung Transplantation
 Lung Transplant Foundation

Organ transplantation
Pulmonary thoracic surgery
Thoracic surgical procedures